Dorotowo  is a village in the administrative district of Gmina Stawiguda, within Olsztyn County, Warmian-Masurian Voivodeship, in northern Poland. It is located in Warmia.

Two historic Warmian wayside shrines are located in Dorotowo.

 (born 1949), Polish regional activist in Warmia, was born in the village.

References

Dorotowo